Nima is a Bhutanese politician who has been a member of the National Council of Bhutan, since May 2018. Previously, he was a member of the National Council of Bhutan from 2013 to 2018.

Education
He holds a Master of Arts degree in Human Services Counseling and a Bachelor of Arts (Hons) degree in Geography.

References 

Members of the National Council (Bhutan)
1970s births
Living people